The Donegal International Rally is an annual sporting event held in County Donegal, Ireland. It is a well-established Irish annual rally competition and has been one of the most important events in the Irish Rallying calendar. It has a reputation for being one of the country's most challenging rallies. Organized by the Donegal Motor Club, the annual event begins and concludes in Letterkenny.

Donegal International Rally has been one of the rounds of the Irish Tarmac Rally Championship for a number of years.

History

1972 event 
The winner of the first event was Cahal Curley. When the event began in 1972, it was based in Downings, but, afterwards, it moved to Letterkenny.

1985 event 
At the 1985 event there was just a one second-difference between the top two finishing cars.

2001 event 
The event, along with most events that year, was cancelled due to the outbreak of foot-and-mouth disease.

This was significant blow to local economy. The event is estimated to be worth over €20 million to the Donegal economy each year. The rally attracts approximately 120,000 spectators each year.

2002 event 
At the 2002 event two marshals were killed. The two 22-year-old men, one from Moville, the other from Crossmaglen, died when a car crashed into spectators at around 2.00 pm. Three men were also injured. The remaining stages of the event were cancelled after the serious accident on Stage Two. Andrew Nesbitt was announced as winner as he led the rally at the time of the accident.

This led to the Motorsport Commission to inspect safety at all future events.

2008 event 

At the 2008 event an 18-year-old spectator died after being hit by a competing car, at 3.30 pm. The accident happened at Ballyare, about four miles from Letterkenny. The man was pronounced dead at the scene. The road was closed and did not re-open for some time. Organisers cancelled the rally for the rest of the day and later announced that the 2008 event would be abandoned as a mark of respect Eugene Donnelly was announced as winner as he led the rally at the time of the accident.

2010 event 
On Saturday Afternoon 19 June 2010, a co-driver died after the car he was in crashed on the Knockalla stage, south of Portsalon, of the event shortly after 3 pm. Thomas Maguire, Aged 26, from Longwood, County Meath was killed and his driver, Shane Buckley, critically injured.  As a result, the final stage of the rally was cancelled. This was the first time in the rally's history that a competitor was killed during the rally.

2019 event 

The Donegal Rally continued to be a counting round of the FIA Celtic Rally Trophy since 2016. The event attracted a lot of international attention, including Ken Block who showcased his Ford Escort Cosworth. Ken crashed out at SS2 on the first day, but was back the second day under rally 2 rule.

Due to high traffic and spectator volumes, SS7 on the first day had to be cancelled as a safety measure. On the third day of the rally, 23 June 2019 at approximately 12:30 IST, three-time and defending champion Manus Kelly crashed during a stage on the Fanad Head loop. His Hyundai i20 R5 went through a hedge into a field and was extensively damaged. Gardaí confirmed that Kelly had died in the incident. His injured co-driver Donall Barrett was taken to hospital and the remaining stages of the rally were cancelled. A 41-year-old father of five and a prominent local businessman, Kelly had been elected to Donegal County Council less than a month before his death. Numerous politicians and representatives of the Irish motorsport community expressed sympathy to his family and paid tribute to the late champion, with Taoiseach Leo Varadkar calling him a "phenomenal motorsportsman." At his funeral, 2014 champion Declan Boyle drove Kelly's Subaru Impreza S12B WRC before the funeral cortège, with Kelly's son in the passenger seat. Following the funeral mass, Kelly's brothers and friends carried his coffin across the Donegal International Rally ramp.

2020 event 

On 12 March all motorsports events were postponed in the light of the coronavirus pandemic. On 20 March, Motorsport Ireland issued a statement that all motorsport events are suspended until 1 June 2020. On 28 April the Tarmac Rally Organisers' Association (TROA) announced that the 2020 Irish Tarmac Rally Championship is cancelled. There were hopes that the event could still go ahead anyway, as non-counting round of the ITRC.

Shortly after Motorsport Ireland announcement messages on Facebook started circulating that the Donegal Rally is cancelled. Other sources claimed that it has been postponed. Donegal Motor Club stepped in to correct the rumours that the event is not cancelled, and if permitted, will go ahead as planned on 19–21 June. However, after the government released a road map on easing the COVID-19 restrictions on 6 May, Motorsport Ireland released a statement same day that in line with Phase 4 of this road map the suspension of all motor sports events is extended until the 20 July 2020. Rally events fall under Phase 5 of the guidelines and will not be considered until after the 10 August 2020. The restrictions continued into 2021.

2021 event 
As the country remained subject to restrictions aimed at controlling the ongoing COVID-19 pandemic, the TROA made an announcement on 3 February 2021 to cancel the 2021 Championship. As the vaccinations were progressing, at the end of May Motorsport Ireland announced that motorsports events can resume from 7 June, subject to local restrictions. Remaining restrictions made impossible for Donegal International Rally to take place. Instead, a virtual Donegal Rally was held on the traditional days of the event - series of virtual interviews, videos of past rallies, and social media posts.

2022 event 
This year's event consisted of 301 kilometres over 20 stages. It was a counting round of the Irish Tarmac Rally Championship and the Celtic Rally Trophy. The starting grid was capped at maximum of 160 competitors, plus 25 historic and 25 junior competitors. The starting fee was EUR 1600. The event was labelled as the biggest rally of the year in Ireland. An incident occurred where a 62-year-old man was arrested after damaging one of the competitor cars by cutting wires and the fuel lines.

Winners

Sponsors 
The event was previously sponsored by Shell and Topaz Energy. The current sponsors of the Donegal International Rally are the Joule Group and The Mount Errigal Hotel.

References

External links 
 Official Site
 Donegal International Rally Past Winners
 James McDaid Crash Video – 1986
 Donegal International Rally Images on Letterkenny Guide
 Donegal International Rally Images on Flickr
 Donegal International Rally Images on Rally Retro

Annual events in Ireland
Rally competitions in Ireland
Motorsport competitions in Ireland
Sport in Letterkenny
Sport in County Donegal